Daniel Bellissimo (born August 15, 1984) is a Canadian-born Italian professional ice hockey goaltender. He is currently playing with Luleå HF of the Swedish Elitserien. Is active GM of Streetsville in the SOHL 

Born in Toronto, Bellissimo played junior hockey in the OPJHL for the Vaughan Vipers. He moved to the Italian team HC Asiago in 2006, where he played with his brother Vince. He won two Top League title in Italy.

Thanks to his Italian origins, he participated at the 2010 IIHF World Championship as a member of the Italy men's national ice hockey team.

References

External links

1984 births
Living people
Canadian ice hockey goaltenders
Italian ice hockey players
Luleå HF players
Ice hockey people from Toronto
Timrå IK players
Canadian expatriate ice hockey players in Sweden